was a town located in Shimoge District, Ōita Prefecture, Japan.

As of 2003, the village had an estimated population of 5,574 and the density of 121.12 persons per km2. The total area was 46.02 km2.

On March 1, 2005, Sankō, along with the towns of Hon'yabakei, Yabakei and Yamakuni (all from Shimoge District), was merged into the expanded city of Nakatsu.

Dissolved municipalities of Ōita Prefecture